The 2012 Patriot League baseball tournament was held on consecutive weekends, with the semifinals held May 12–13 and the finals May 19-20.  The higher seeded teams hosted each best of three series.  Top seeded  won their sixth championship and earned the conference's automatic bid to the 2012 NCAA Division I baseball tournament.

Seeding
The top four finishers from the regular season were seeded one through four, with the top seed hosting the fourth seed and second seed hosting the third.  The visiting team was designated as the home team in the second game of each series.  Army hosted Lafayette, while Holy Cross hosted Navy in the semifinals.  Holy Cross traveled to Army for the final.

Results

Semifinals

Lafayette vs. Army

Navy vs. Holy Cross

Final

All-Tournament Team
The following players were named to the All-Tournament Team.

Most Valuable Player
Zach Price was named tournament Most Valuable Player.  Price was a senior second baseman for Army.

References

Tournament
Patriot League Baseball Tournament
Patriot League baseball tournament
Patriot League baseball tournament